Robert Draper is a writer.

Robert Draper may also refer to:

Robert Draper (bishop), Anglican bishop in Ireland
Robert Draper (cricketer) (1903–1987), cricketer for Somerset
Robert Draper (MP) (died 1395/6), MP for Bath, England
Robert Draper (painter), Navajo painter of landscapes
Robert Draper, character in Pacific Blackout
Robert Draper, singer with The Accents